The axe bow is a wave-piercing type of a ship's bow, characterised by a vertical stem and a relatively long and narrow entry (front hull). The forefoot is deep and the freeboard relatively high, with little flare, so that the bow profile resembles an axe. The bow cuts through the water, and is less affected by passing through waves than a bow with more flare, making this bow type much less susceptible to pitching. Because the deep forefoot does not generally rise above the water level, it is less susceptible to slamming. The axe bow moves the centre of lateral area forwards and the vessel may need considerably more rudder motion to hold its course, and this increases with the wave steepness.

A vertical prow is not unique; they were common in the early steam era. The innovation of the axe bow is combined with a lengthened bow of the ship. This concept was developed in the Netherlands by Lex Keuning of Delft University of Technology, Damen Shipyards Group, Marin (Maritime Research Institute Netherlands), the Royal Netherlands Sea Rescue Institution, the Royal Netherlands Navy, Damen Schelde Naval Shipbuilding and the United States Coast Guard.

Related energy saving bow designs

Ax-Box
This is a bulbous bow with a wave-deflecting axe-shape at the top of the prow. It was developed by NKK of Japan, and first noted in the early 2000s. It offers an advantage of several percent in added resistance by incident waves over the ordinary bow shape.

LEADGE-bow
The LEADGE (or LEAding eDGE) bow is a non-bulbous bow that fills in between the bulb and the Ax to form a straight and vertical bow, slightly higher than normal prow to ensure wave deflection. It was first described by K, Hirota et al. in 2005. It offers an advantage of about 5% over the Ax-box and a further similar amount over the ordinary bow from incident wave resistance.

See also

References

External links

Watercraft components
Ship design